Czaple may refer to the following places in Poland:
Czaple, Lower Silesian Voivodeship (south-west Poland)
Czaple, Góra County in Lower Silesian Voivodeship (south-west Poland)
Czaple, Świecie County in Kuyavian-Pomeranian Voivodeship (north-central Poland)
Czaple, Wąbrzeźno County in Kuyavian-Pomeranian Voivodeship (north-central Poland)
Czaple, Włocławek County in Kuyavian-Pomeranian Voivodeship (north-central Poland)
Czaple, Podlaskie Voivodeship (north-east Poland)
Czaple, Masovian Voivodeship (east-central Poland)
Czaple, Lubusz Voivodeship (west Poland)
Czaple, Bytów County in Pomeranian Voivodeship (north Poland)
Czaple, Kartuzy County in Pomeranian Voivodeship (north Poland)
Czaple, Warmian-Masurian Voivodeship (north Poland)
Czaple, West Pomeranian Voivodeship (north-west Poland)